The 2016 McDonald's All-American Girls Game is an All-Star basketball game that was played on March 30, 2016, at the United Center in Chicago, Illinois, home of the Chicago Bulls. The game's rosters featured the best and most highly recruited high school girls graduating in 2016.  The game is the 15th annual version of the McDonald's All-American Game first played in 2002.

2016 Game
The 2016 McDonald's Game featured one of the highest scoring games in history on the girls' side. The West ultimately ended up winning by a final score of 97-88 in overtime. This was the game's first overtime in history - boys or girls. Sabrina Ionescu also made history by scoring 25 points - a new scoring record for the game. The record was previously held by Elizabeth Williams.

The West came back to tie the game 86-86 with just less than a minute left on a three-pointer from Lauren Cox. The game went into overtime and while the East was able to score first, the West ended the game with an 11-0 run to secure the victory.

2016 East Roster

2016 West Roster

Coaches
The East team was coached by:
 Head Coach — Marcia Pinder of Dillard High School (Fort Lauderdale, Florida)

The West team was coached by:
 Head Coach - Jesse Nelson of Olpe High School (Emporia, Kansas)

Game

See also
2016 McDonald's All-American Boys Game

References

External links
McDonald's All-American on the web

2016 in American women's basketball
2016